Harald Espedal (born 4 March 1972) is a Norwegian businessperson.

He is a son of Tor Espedal, and stood out in his early teenage years as a stock trade prodigy. He was born in Stavanger, graduated from the Norwegian School of Economics in 1996 and spent his early career in SR-Bank, Vesta Forsikring and Arthur Andersen's Stavanger branch.

He was the chief executive officer of Skagenfondene from 2002 to 2014, has chaired the board of Lyse Energi, Sandnes Sparebank and Espedal & Co, deputy chair of the Oslo Stock Exchange and Stavanger Concert Hall and has been a board member of Aspelin Ramm and the Norwegian National Opera and Ballet. He has also invested heavily in Viking FK.

References

1934 births
Living people
People from Stavanger
Norwegian School of Economics alumni
Norwegian businesspeople